The Nikanassin Range is a group of mountain ranges in the Canadian Rockies on the eastern edge of Jasper National Park in Alberta, Canada. It is developed south-east of the Fiddle Range, and one of the front ranges. Nikanassin means "first range" in Cree.

Numerous seams of coal are found in this range, with past and present mines at Cadomin, Mountain Park and Luscar.

The range gives the name to the Nikanassin Formation, a stratigraphical unit of late Jurassic age that has its stratotype in this region.

Peaks

References

Ranges of the Canadian Rockies